Michel Medinger Sr. (17 January 1909 – 15 August 1992) was a Luxembourgian long-distance runner. He competed in the men's 5000 metres at the 1936 Summer Olympics. His son, Michael, competed at the 1964 Summer Olympics.

References

External links
 

1909 births
1992 deaths
Athletes (track and field) at the 1936 Summer Olympics
Luxembourgian male long-distance runners
Olympic athletes of Luxembourg
Place of birth missing